The Matas do Segredo State Park is an urban state park in the state of Mato Grosso do Sul, Brazil.
It protects an area of cerrado forest.

Location

The Matas do Segredo State Park protects a remnant of cerrado forest within the urban area of Campo Grande, Mato Grosso do Sul.
The park is the source of many springs that feed the Córrego Segredo.
The park adjoins residential neighborhoods to the south and east, and pasture areas to the north and west.
The urban areas both put pressure on the park and give it support as one of the few remaining green areas in the city.

History

In the 1980s the area was known as the Chácara Santa Inês.
Part of it was sold to a company that intended to develop it as a residential area, but this was stopped by the action of neighborhood residents associations, environmentalists and civil society organizations. who proposed expropriation to create a botanical garden for the state capital.
Due to bureaucratic problems no action was taken for several years.
With the development of large neighborhoods nearby the area suffered from hunting and extraction of forest products. 
People started fires, and trails had to be opened to give access fire department vehicles, which accelerated the degradation by hunters and gatherers.

A proposal was signed on 18 November 1990 to turn the area into a conservation unit, in part to protect the important water sources that it contains.
The state governor created the Campo Grande Botanical Garden by decree 7.119/93 of 17 March 1993 to preserve the biodiversity of the cerrado and to protect the water sources. SEMA was given 180 days to start administering the area, but this did not happen.

The state government transferred the botanical garden to Matas do Segredo State Park by decree 9.935 of 5 June 2000.
The objective is to protect the springs of Córrego Segredo, and the fauna and flora of the cerrado.
On 17 April 2015 the State Secretary for Environment and Economic Development inaugurated the visitor center.

Environment

The Köppen climate classification is Aw, with dry winters and rainy summers.

Random surveys of the vegetation have identified 188 species in 63 families.
The greatest number of species were in the family Fabaceae (22), followed by the Rubiaceae (10), Apocynaceae, Bignoniaceae and Sapindaceae (8), and the Annonaceae and Euphorbiaceae (7).
There were 10 herbaceous species, 38 shrubs, 111 trees, 24 vines and one parasite.
The greatest diversity of species was found in the cerrado areas (96 species), followed by cerradão (56 species).
Overall the site had good diversity of flora.

Activities

The park is used for research and for environmental education for school children.
The park has ecological trails, a belvedere and a visitor center.
The park works with the Military Environmental Police on the Florestinha Project, where children and adolescents attend after-school classes and activities that teach them about conservation and citizenship.
The program is popular with students, who help with environmental awareness programs in the neighborhood.

Notes

Sources

State parks of Brazil
Protected areas established in 2000
2000 establishments in Brazil
Protected areas of Mato Grosso do Sul